The Saluzzo Roosters, formerly known as the North West Roosters, are a rugby league club based in Saluzzo, Piedmont, Italy. Founded in 2010 as a rugby union club, the Roosters changed to playing rugby league in 2015. They currently compete in the Provence-Alpes-Côte d'Azur (PACA) division of the French National Division 2. As of 2019 they have since switched back to Rugby Union.

2017/18 season 
The Roosters became the first Italian rugby league club to play in a foreign competition when they joined the PACA division of the National Division 2, France's fourth-tier rugby league competition, for the 2016/17 season. Coached by Elio Giacoma, the team sported Gioele Celerino and Mirco Bergamasco in their final match, which was their only win of the competition.

References 

Italian rugby league teams
Italian rugby union teams
Rugby clubs established in 2010
2010 establishments in Italy